This is a list of maritime colleges, grouped by geographical region and country.

Africa

Americas

Asia

Europe

Oceania

See also

Marine propulsion

References

Lists of universities and colleges

Colleges